The tornado outbreak of late-April 1909 was a deadly tornado outbreak that affected much of the central and Southern United States between April 29 and May 1, 1909. Affecting particularly the Mississippi and Tennessee Valleys, it killed over 150 people, 60 of them in the U.S. state of Tennessee alone. It was the deadliest known tornado outbreak to affect Tennessee until March 21, 1952, when 64 people died statewide. To this day, the 1909 outbreak remains the second-deadliest on record in Tennessee—even the April 3–4, 1974 Super Outbreak and the February 5–6, 2008, Super Tuesday outbreak produced just 45 and 31 deaths each in the state.

Meteorological synopsis
During the late afternoon and the overnight hours of April 29, 1909, numerous strong to violent tornadoes affected the areas of northern Alabama, eastern Arkansas, southern Illinois, northern Mississippi, southeastern Missouri, and western Tennessee (the NWS Memphis, Tennessee, coverage area). In that general area, at least 55 were killed by tornadoes.

While it was estimated to be an F4, some reports indicate that there was more than one tornado. Among the towns affected were Horn Lake, Mississippi, where about half of the fatalities were recorded, and Whitehaven, Tennessee, where the tornado damaged 30 homes. The parent supercell thunderstorm continued on to produce additional tornadoes in Scott County.

North of Memphis, Tennessee, two F3 tornadoes killed a total of 22 from Crittenden County, Arkansas, to Carroll County, Tennessee. Homes were destroyed in Marion, Arkansas, resulting in five deaths in Arkansas. In Tennessee, the town of Locke was mostly destroyed by the first F3 tornado. The second F3 tornado flattened structures near Covington and Medina. Several of the injured people who later died were plantation workers. A family of tornadoes also affected later Hickman and Williamson Counties southwest of Nashville and later moved into Cookeville and Putnam Counties. Three other tornadoes killed four people in the Memphis coverage area, including in St. Francis and Lee Counties in Arkansas and Haywood County in Tennessee.

Other F4 recorded were reported in Missouri near Golden, in Illinois near Texas City, and in south-central Tennessee near Bee Springs, just north of the Alabama state line. 11 deaths were recorded in the Missouri storm, 5 near Texas City and 29 along the Alabama-Tennessee state line. The Bee Springs tornado touched down in northernmost Limestone County, Alabama, before crossing the into Lincoln and Giles Counties in Tennessee. Hardest-hit areas were in and around Pulaski, Bryson and Fayetteville. Another strong tornado struck Franklin County near Decherd.

Historical perspective
The April 1909 outbreak was part of an active and deadly year nationally for tornadoes. The 77 killer tornadoes recorded in the year 1909 marked an all-time yearly record for the number of killer tornadoes, a total that was only equaled in the year 1917. However, the 1909 outbreak did not produce any F5 tornadoes on the Fujita scale; only one such event occurred in Tennessee on April 16, 1998.

Confirmed tornadoes

April 29 event

April 30 event

See also
 List of North American tornadoes and tornado outbreaks

References

Bibliography

Tornadoes of 1909
F4 tornadoes by date
Tornadoes in Tennessee
Tornadoes in Missouri
Tornadoes in Alabama
Tornadoes in Illinois
1909 natural disasters in the United States
April 1909 events